Andrew Dearman is a South Australian photographer and arts educator, known for his work with vintage cameras and vintage photographic methods  such as tintypes and ambrotypes. He frequently conducts workshops and demonstrations into historical photographic techniques.

Biography 

Dearman is an Adelaide-based photographer and his 2008 doctoral thesis is titled Art Practice and Governmentality: The Role Modelling Effects of Contemporary Art Practice and its Institutions from the University of South Australia.  Dearman also conducts academic research into analogue photography and contemporary art, which he sees as forming part of his art practice. He lectures at Adelaide Central School of Art.

Artistic style and subject 
Although Dearman began as sculptor, he moved into photography and now uses vintage and antique cameras and vintage photographic techniques, along with found photographs and films to create his artworks. Dearman makes cameras and has also built a portable darkroom (dubbed the ‘Beasty’).

Bibliography 
Works by Dearman:

 2004/5. A Box of Tea. Vitamin, Episode Three November/December/January, pp. 14-15
 2008. Art practice and governmentality: the role modelling effects of contemporary art practice and its institutions. 
 2008. 'Rosencrantz & Guildenstern Are Dead.’ Performing disjunct memory through an early 20th century Danish family photo album—in early 21st century South Australia.  [Image [&] Narrative e-journal, 23. 
 2011. Working (with) the Dead: Agency and its Absence in the Use of the Found Image. Colloquy 22.
 2016. The Green Room: Nazia Ejaz.

Further reading 
 Kimber, Mark. Processing the past: Contemporary photomedia in South Australia. Art Monthly Australia, no.274, October 2014, pp. 20–23.

References

External links 
 Video: Andrew Dearman Disappearance 2015
 Video: Around Again final

Living people
Artists from South Australia
Australian contemporary artists
Australian photographers
Photographers from Adelaide
20th-century Australian artists
21st-century Australian artists
Australian art teachers
Year of birth missing (living people)
University of South Australia alumni